Banks railway station was on the West Lancashire Railway in England. It served the village of Banks near Southport.

The station and line opened on 19 February 1878. On that day, the first passenger train was greeted at Banks by "simple songs" from the Church School children. The vicar of Banks, a passenger on the train, rewarded them with a "shower of coppers".

The station had a depot in its goods yard for coal merchants in Banks. Along the track, towards Preston, the first crossing was at Long Lane.  The crossing keeper who opened the gates for farmers and anyone else wanting to take vehicles or cows across had a house provided with the job.

Mrs. Mary Wignall of Ralph's Wife's Lane was interviewed by a local newspaper reporter in 1958 when she was 93 and the oldest resident in Banks. She said, "I well remember watching the first train pass through the village with scores of school children lining the route catching pastries, cakes and oranges thrown from windows".

The station and line closed on 7 September 1964.

References

Disused railway stations in the Borough of West Lancashire
Railway stations in Great Britain opened in 1878
Railway stations in Great Britain closed in 1964
Former Lancashire and Yorkshire Railway stations
Beeching closures in England